The Thirteenth Floor is a 1999 science fiction neo-noir film written and directed by Josef Rusnak, and produced by Roland Emmerich through his Centropolis Entertainment company. It is loosely based upon Simulacron-3 (1964), a novel by Daniel F. Galouye, and a remake of the German TV-film World on a Wire (1973). The film stars Craig Bierko, Gretchen Mol, Armin Mueller-Stahl, Vincent D'Onofrio, and Dennis Haysbert. In 2000, The Thirteenth Floor was nominated for the Saturn Award for Best Science Fiction Film, but lost to The Matrix.

Plot
In 1999 Los Angeles, Hannon Fuller (Mueller-Stahl) owns a multibillion-dollar computer enterprise and is the inventor of a newly completed virtual reality (VR) simulation of 1937 Los Angeles, filled with simulated humans unaware they are computer programs. When Fuller is murdered just as he begins premature testing of the VR system, his friend and protégé, Douglas Hall (Bierko), who is also the heir to the company, becomes the primary suspect. The evidence against him is so strong that Hall begins to doubt his own innocence.

Between interrogations by LAPD Detective Larry McBain (Haysbert), Hall meets Jane Fuller (Gretchen Mol), the estranged daughter of Hannon Fuller, who is busy with the shutdown of the new VR system. Hall then romances her. When a local bartender is murdered after he claims to have witnessed a meeting between Hall and Fuller on the night Fuller was murdered, Hall is arrested. He is released when Jane gives him an alibi.

With the assistance of his associate Whitney (D'Onofrio), Hall attempts to find a message that Fuller left for him inside the simulation. Entering the virtual reality, Hall becomes a bank clerk named John Ferguson. Fuller left the message with a bartender named Jerry Ashton (D'Onofrio), who read the message and discovered he is an artificial creation. Earlier, Ashton notices that Ferguson switched places with Hall in the men's restroom of the hotel where Ashton works, and began to realize that something was wrong. Frightened and angry, Ashton tries to kill Hall. Hall barely survives to escape the VR.

McBain informs Hall that Jane does not exist, as Fuller never had a daughter. Hall tracks her down only to discover her double, Natasha Molinaro, working as a grocery store clerk, but Molinaro does not recognize Hall. This leads Hall to perform an experiment outside the VR system, something that Fuller's message instructed him to try: drive to a place where he never would have considered going otherwise. He does so, and discovers a point beyond which the world becomes a crude wireframe model. Hall grasps the revelation behind Fuller's message: 1999 Los Angeles is itself a simulation.

Jane Fuller explains the truth to Hall: his world is one of thousands of virtual worlds, but it is the only one in which one of the occupants has developed a virtual world of his own. Jane Fuller lives in the real world outside the simulation in the 1990s. After Fuller's death, she entered the virtual version to assume the guise of Fuller's daughter, gain control of the company, and shut down the simulated 1937 reality, a plan foiled by Hall being made the company heir. The virtual Hall is modeled after David, Jane's real-world husband, though Jane has since fallen in love with Hall. David committed the murders via Hall's body, being driven to increasingly jealous and psychopathic behavior from prolonged use of VR to live out his dark fantasies.

Whitney enters the 1937 simulation, assuming the body of bartender Jerry Ashton, who has kidnapped Ferguson (Hall's 1937 identity) and bound him in the trunk of his car. When Whitney is killed in a car crash inside the 1937 simulation, Ashton's consciousness takes control of Whitney's body in the 1990s simulation and takes Hall hostage. Hall tells Ashton that he is not in the real world, and that they are both products of a VR simulation. Hall takes Ashton to the place where he was 'born': a computer lab. David assumes control of Hall again to kill Ashton and then attempts to rape and murder Jane. Jane is rescued by Detective McBain, who shoots and kills David. McBain at this point has realized the nature of his own reality, and jokingly asks Jane, "So, is somebody going to unplug me now?" She answers "no", so McBain follows with the request "Look, do me a favor, when you get back to wherever it is you come from, just leave us the hell alone down here, okay?"

David's death as Hall in the 1990s simulation allows Hall's artificial consciousness to take control of David's body in the real world. He wakes in 2024, connected to a VR system. He disconnects the system and finds Jane and her father, the real Hannon Fuller. Jane wants to tell Hall more about the simulation, but as she begins the film ends, the screen image collapsing to a thin line of light before going dark like a computer monitor being turned off.

Cast
 Craig Bierko as John Ferguson (1937), Douglas Hall (1999), and David (2024)
 Gretchen Mol as Natasha Molinaro (1999) and Jane Fuller (2024)
 Armin Mueller-Stahl as Grierson (1937), Hannon Fuller (1999), and Jane's father (2024)
 Vincent D'Onofrio as Jerry Ashton (1937) and Jason Whitney (1999)
 Dennis Haysbert as Detective Larry McBain (1999)
 Shiri Appleby as Bridget Manilla (1937)
 Leon Rippy as Jane's Lawyer (1999)
 Rif Hutton as Joe (1999)
 Jeremy Roberts as Tom Jones (1999)
 Janet MacLachlan as Ellen (1999)
 Steven Schub as Detective Zev Bernstein (1999)
Alison Lohman as Honey Bear Girl (1937)

Production

The Thirteenth Floor was a co-production of Columbia Pictures and Centropolis Entertainment. Most of the film was shot in Los Angeles, California.

Release
The Thirteenth Floor was first released in Denmark on April 16, 1999, followed by a North American release on May 28, 1999. 
It grossed $11.9 million in North America, and $18.5 million worldwide. The Thirteenth Floor was released on DVD on October 5, 1999, and on Blu-ray on April 14, 2009.

Reception
The Thirteenth Floor received mostly negative reviews.
Rotten Tomatoes, a review aggregator, reported that 30% of critics gave the film positive reviews, with an average score of 4.51/10, based upon a sample of 64 reviews, and the critical consensus "Bad script and confusing plot undermine the movie's impressive visuals." At Metacritic, the film received an average score of 36/100, based on 22 reviews. Audiences polled by CinemaScore gave the film an average grade of "D+" on an A+ to F scale.

Philosopher Slavoj Žižek called the film “much better than The Matrix.”

Awards and nominations

See also

 Brain in a vat
 eXistenZ, 1999 film
 Simulated reality
 Simulated reality in fiction
 The Matrix
 World on a Wire, 1973 TV film based on the same book

References

External links
 Full movie at 
 
 
 
 
 

1999 films
1990s science fiction thriller films
German science fiction thriller films
English-language German films
Films about consciousness transfer
Films based on American novels
Films based on science fiction novels
Films set in 1937
Films set in 1999
Films set in 2024
Films set in Los Angeles
Films shot in Los Angeles
Films about telepresence
Films scored by Harald Kloser
American remakes of German films
Columbia Pictures films
Centropolis Entertainment films
Films about simulated reality
1990s English-language films
Films directed by Josef Rusnak
1990s German films